Alfred Wesley Gwinn, Jr. is a former residing bishop of the North Carolina Annual Conference of the United Methodist Church. He held the office of Bishop of North Carolina from 2004 to 2012. His offices were located in Raleigh, North Carolina.

Biography
Gwinn's last appointment before being appointed bishop was as the senior pastor of First United Methodist Church in Lexington, Kentucky.

During his ten-year tenure at Lexington Centenary, he led the congregation through relocation and the building of an $11 million facility. Worship attendance doubled and became the largest in the conference. In addition, the church parented a new multicultural congregation, developed an ongoing ministry partnership with a congregation in Londrina, Brazil, and brought an African-American pastor on staff, the first in the conference to serve a predominantly-white congregation.

In 2012, Gwinn retired from the bishopric and was succeeded by Bishop Hope Morgan Ward.

Personal life
Gwinn is married to Joyce Hannah Gwinn, a retired coronary care nurse.
They have two adult daughters: Debbie Mann and Christy Morgan. They have four grandchildren, Wesley, Luke, Tyler, and Ally.

Titles and honors
 Associate director of the Conference Council on Ministries.
 Lexington district superintendent (during which time he served as dean of the cabinet)
 Chairman of the Board of Ordained Ministry (1996–2004)
 Chairman of  the Committee on New Church Starts
 Trustee of Methodist Wesley Village and Kentucky United Methodist Foundation
 Trustee of Kentucky Wesleyan College for 14 years.
 Chairman the Area Episcopal Committee (1992–2000)
 General Conference delegate in 1988, 1992, 1996 and 2000 (secretary of the Legislative Committee on Higher Education) and head of the delegation in 2004

Member of the General Council on Ministries and the Southeastern Jurisdictional Administrative Council

Degrees
Bachelor's degree from University of Kentucky
Master of Divinity from Asbury Theological Seminary
Honorary Doctor of Divinity from Union College, Kentucky Wesleyan College, and Asbury Theological Seminary

Pastoral appointments
1967 Red House
1969 Mount Zion
1974 Associate Director, Conference Council on Ministries
1976 Covington First United Methodist
1980 Corbin First United Methodist
1982 Winchester First United Methodist
1987 Lexington Centenary
1997 Lexington District Superintendent
2000 Lexington First United Methodist
2004 Bishop, North Carolina Conference
2008 Bishop, North Carolina Conference

References

Living people
United Methodist bishops of the Southeastern Jurisdiction
University of Kentucky alumni
Asbury Theological Seminary alumni
Year of birth missing (living people)